Baosheng Dadi is a Deity of Medicine worshiped in Chinese folk religion and Taoism. The deity is very popular in Fujian, Taiwan and the Chinese communities in Southeast Asia.

Historical Personage 

Wu Tao or Wu Ben was born in the village of Bailiao near Xiamen in Fujian Province, during the Song Dynasty in the year 979.  He was a skilled doctor and Taoist practitioner who was credited with performing medical miracles, including applying eye drops to a dragon’s eye and removing a foreign object from a tiger’s throat. After his death in 1036, he began to be worshiped as a deity. His deified status was officially recognized by the Hongxi Emperor of the Ming Dynasty who conferred on him the title of “Imperial Inspector at Heavenly Gate, Miracle Doctor of Compassion Relief, Great Taoist Immortal, and the Long-lived, Unbounded, Life Protection Emperor”.

Worship 
He is worshiped at many temples in Fujian and Taiwan, including the famous Dalongdong Baoan Temple in Taipei. His birthday is celebrated with parades and festivals on the 15th day of the third lunar month.

Some of the temples dedicated to Baosheng Dadi 
 Dalongdong Baoan Temple, Taipei
 Zuoying Ciji Temple, Kaohsiung
 Yuanbao Temple, Taichung City
 Jen Wu Temple, Chiayi City
 Xian'an Temple, Changhua County

Gallery

See also 

 Chinese folk religion
 Shennong Dadi
 Huatuo Xianshi

Portal:China

References 

Chinese gods
Health gods
Hokkien Taoism
Medicine deities